The Star Mazda Pro is an open-wheel formula racing car, designed, developed and built by Star Race Cars, for the North American Pro Mazda Championship spec-series, between 2004 and 2017. They were powered by  "Renesis" wankel rotary engine.

References

Open wheel racing cars
Indy Pro 2000 Championship